DXIC may refer to:
 DXIC-AM, an AM radio station broadcasting in Iligan
 DXIC-FM, an FM radio station broadcasting in General Santos, branded as Hope Radio